Cyndi Grecco (born May 19, 1952) is an American singer best-known for performing the theme tune to the popular 1970s American television show Laverne & Shirley.

The theme to Laverne & Shirley was titled "Making Our Dreams Come True," in which Grecco was accompanied by The Ron Hicklin Singers. It was also put out as a single and charted, peaking at No. 25 in the Billboard Hot 100 of July 4, 1976. The song came out on the small Private Stock Records label (#45086). Grecco was managed by Janna Feliciano, then-wife of José Feliciano, and was a featured performer at the 1977 Sun Bowl.

An album followed, though a second disco-themed single, "Dancing, Dancing", failed to chart. Grecco also provided the theme to another 1970s ABC television sitcom, Blansky's Beauties. Nevertheless, Grecco remains a one-hit wonder.

Discography

Albums
Making Our Dreams Come True (1976)
Wish Upon a Star (1982)

Singles
"Making Our Dreams Come True"
"Dancing, Dancing"
"Hello Again"
"This Time I'm in It for Love"
"You Made Love Come True"

See also
List of 1970s one-hit wonders in the United States

References

External links

[ Cyndi Grecco] at AllMusic
Cyndi Grecco at Discogs
American Bandstand 1976- Interview Cyndi Grecco via YouTube
Cyndi Grecco at Bandcamp

American women singers
Living people
1952 births
Private Stock Records artists
21st-century American women